Pseudeuptychia is a genus of satyrid butterflies found in the Neotropical realm.

Species
Listed alphabetically:
Pseudeuptychia hemileuca (Staudinger, [1886])
Pseudeuptychia languida (Butler, 1871)

References

Euptychiina
Butterfly genera
Taxa named by Walter Forster (entomologist)